The Men's 400m T11 had its first round held on September 14, beginning at 11:15. The Semifinals were held on September 15, at 17:10 and the Final was held on September 16 at 19:54.

Medalists

Results

References
Round 1 - Heat 1
Round 1 - Heat 2
Round 1 - Heat 3
Round 1 - Heat 4
Semifinals - Heat 1
Semifinals - Heat 2
Final

Athletics at the 2008 Summer Paralympics